Maa Kasam is a 1999 Indian Hindi-language action film directed by Ashok Gaikwad and produced by Rajiv Babbar, starring Mithun Chakraborty, Mink Singh and Gulshan Grover.

Plot
The movie is about an honest police officer inspector Ajay Shastry who avenges the bad guys for raping his young sister.

Cast
Mithun Chakraborty as Inspector Ajay Shastry
Mink Singh as Anu
Gulshan Grover as Acharya
Nishigandha Wad as Acharya wife
Hemant Birje as  Thakur Anand singh
Asrani as villager
Harish Patel as Police inspector Bhavar
Arjun (Firoz Khan) as Inspector Gashal
Vikas Anand as Police Commissioner
Veeru Krishnan as Acharya's servant
Shiva Rindani  as Thakur Khadak Singh
Kasam Ally as Thakur Shamsher Singh
Col. Trilok Kapoor as Thakur
Gavin Packard as Changeza
Pinky Chinoy as Janki(Ajay's sister)
Shalini Kapoor
Sangeeta Kapure
Tara Malvankar
Hari Babu
Sham Solanki
Ishwar Hemnani
Dr. Niraj Rathod
Vinod Panchal as gang
T.S. Tarana
Surekha

Music
"Dekha Jo Padosan Ma" - Sapna Awasthi
"Nikal Padi Nikal" - Vinod Rathod, Sonali Vajpayee
"Angoorwali Bagiyan" - Sapna Awasthi, Poornima
"Lachke Teri Kamariya" - Jaspinder Narula, Sonu Nigam

References

External links
 

1990 films
1990s Hindi-language films
Mithun's Dream Factory films
Films shot in Ooty
Films scored by Anand–Milind
Films directed by Ashok Gaikwad
Indian rape and revenge films